Michail Papageorgiou (1727–1796) was a Greek philosopher.

He was born in Siatista in 1727. He studied philosophy in the Maroutsaia School of Ioannina under Eugenios Voulgaris. Later he visited Germany where he studied philosophy and medicine. He taught in his birthplace Siatista, and also in Selitsa, Meleniko, Vienna and Budapest. He died in Vienna on 1796.

See also
List of Macedonians (Greek)

External links 
List of Great Macedonians (15th-19th century)

1727 births
1796 deaths
People from Siatista
Greek Macedonians
18th-century Greek philosophers
Macedonia under the Ottoman Empire
Maroutsaia School alumni
18th-century Greek educators
18th-century Greek writers
18th-century Greek physicians